Norman Alfred Male (22 May 1917 – 1992) was an English footballer who played in the Football League for West Bromwich Albion and Walsall.

References

1917 births
1992 deaths
English footballers
West Bromwich Albion F.C. players
Walsall F.C. players
English Football League players
Association football defenders